George Carr may refer to:

George Kirwan Carr Lloyd (AKA George Kirwan Carr, 1810–1877), English army officer and Sussex landowner
G. S. Carr (George Shoobridge Carr, 1837–1914), British mathematician
George Carr (baseball) (1894–1948), American baseball player
George Carr (footballer) (1899–?), English football player and manager
George C. Carr (1929–1990), American lawyer and United States federal judge

See also 
Frank George Griffith Carr (1903–1991), director of the National Maritime Museum, Greenwich, England
George Carr Frison (1924–2020), American archaeologist
Dr. George W. Carr House, an historic house in the College Hill neighborhood of Providence, Rhode Island